This gallery is intended to facilitate searching about those pre-eminent people in the Series on Protestant Missions to Southeast Asia in the Christian Portal.

Burma (Myanmar)

Siam (Thailand) 

Protestant missionaries in Asia
Southeast Asia-related lists
Southeast Asia